Built-in, builtin, or built in may refer to:

Computing
 Shell builtin, a command or a function executed directly in the shell itself
 Builtin function, in computer software and compiler theory

Other uses
 Built-in behavior, of a living organism
 Built-in furniture
 Built-in inflation, a type of inflation that results from past events and persists in the present
 Built-in obsolescence, in industrial design and economics
 Built-in self-test, a mechanism that permits a machine to test itself
 Built-in stabiliser, in macroeconomics

See also
 All pages beginning with "", "" and ""
 All pages with titles containing "", "" and ""
 Built (disambiguation)
 Bulletin (disambiguation)